is a Spanish automotive–engineering company. It was founded in 1904 by Marc Birkigt and Damian Mateu as an automobile manufacturer and eventually had several factories in Spain and France that produced luxury cars, aircraft engines, trucks and weapons. In 1923, its French luxury car arm became a semi-autonomous partnership with the Spanish parent company. In 1946, the Spanish parent company sold all of its Spanish automotive assets to Enasa, a Spanish state-owned vehicle manufacturer, and the French arm continued as an independent aviation engine and components manufacturer under the Hispano-Suiza name. In 1968, Hispano-Suiza was taken over by the aerospace company Snecma, which is now part of the French Safran Group. An attempt to relaunch the marque was made by the company Hispano Suiza Cars associated with the Peralada Group (owned by the Suqué Mateu family) in 2019 with a fully-electric car.

History

Early years
In 1898, a Spanish artillery captain, Emilio de la Cuadra, started electric automobile production in Barcelona under the name of La Cuadra. In Paris, Emilio de la Cuadra met the Swiss engineer Marc Birkigt and hired him to work for the company in Spain. Under his direction, two types of La Cuadra gasoline-powered engine cars were started immediately, one equipped with a 4.5 hp single-cylinder explosion engine and another 1.1-litre two-cylinder model, 7.5 hp. In 1900, these two explosion engines were the first designed and built in Spain by La Cuadra from a Birkigt design. These cars had four wheels, the previous two directional, clutch mechanisms, 3-speed gearbox, chain drive and suspension by crossbows. Two complete vehicles were completed, and there were some more under construction. At some point in 1902, the ownership changed hands to José María Castro Fernández and became Fábrica Hispano-Suiza de Automóviles (Spanish-Swiss Automobile Factory) but this company went bankrupt in December 1903.

Yet another restructuring took place in 1904, creating La Hispano-Suiza Fábrica de Automóviles under Castro's direction, also based in Barcelona. Four new engines were introduced in the next year and a half; a 3.8-litre and 7.4-litre four-cylinder and a pair of big six-cylinder engines were produced. This company managed to avoid bankruptcy and its largest operations remained in Barcelona until 1946, where cars, trucks, buses, aero engines and weapons were produced. Other factories in Spain were at Ripoll, Seville, and Guadalajara.

In 1910 Jean Chassagne competed with a Hispano-Suiza together with works drivers Pilleveridier and Zucarelli in the Coupe des Voiturettes Boulogne and the Catalan Cup Races, gaining second and fourth places respectively. France was soon proving to be a larger market for Hispano-Suiza's luxury cars than Spain. In 1911, an assembly factory called Hispano France began operating in the Paris suburb of Levallois-Perret. Production was moved to larger factories at Bois-Colombes, under the name Hispano-Suiza in 1914 and soon became Hispano-Suiza's main plant for producing the largest, most costly models.

World War I

With the start of World War I, Hispano-Suiza turned to the design and production of aircraft engines under the direction of Marc Birkigt. His chief engineer during this period was another Swiss, Louis Massuger. Traditionally, aircraft engines were manufactured by machining separate steel cylinders and then bolting these assemblies directly to the crankcase. Birkigt's novel solution, the Hispano-Suiza 8, called for the engine block to be formed from a single piece of cast aluminum, and into which thin steel liners were secured. Manufacturing an engine in this way simplified construction and resulted in a lighter, yet stronger more durable engine. Thus, Birkigt's new construction method created the first practical, and what are commonly known today as, "cast block" engines. His aluminum cast block V-8 design was also noteworthy for incorporating overhead camshafts, propeller reduction gearing and other desirable features that would not appear together on competitors' engines until the late 1920s. Another major design feature, for the later HS.8B line was the use of a hollow propeller shaft for both the 8B and 8C gear-reduction versions, which when used for the HS.8C versions specifically engineered to accommodate one, to allow heavy calibre (usually 37 mm) projectiles firing through the hollow propeller shaft, avoiding the need for a synchronization gear, a feature used in future Hispano-Suiza military engines. Hispano-Suiza's aero engines, produced at its own factories and under license, became the most commonly used aero engines in the French and British air forces, powering over half the alliance's fighter aircraft.

1918–1936

After World War I, Hispano-Suiza returned to automobile manufacturing and in 1919 they introduced the Hispano-Suiza H6. The H6 featured an inline 6-cylinder overhead camshaft engine based on the features of its V8 aluminium World War I aircraft engines and had coachwork done by well known coachbuilders like Hibbard & Darrin and D'Ieteren.

Licences for Hispano-Suiza patents were much in demand from prestige car manufacturers world-wide. Rolls-Royce used a number of Hispano-Suiza patents. For instance, for many years Rolls-Royce installed Hispano-Suiza designed power brakes in its vehicles.

In 1923, the French arm of Hispano-Suiza was incorporated as the Société Française Hispano-Suiza, the Spanish parent company retaining control with 71% of the share capital. The French subsidiary was granted a large degree of financial and project independence to bring design and production direction into closer contact with its main markets but overall direction remained at Barcelona. This arrangement increased the importance of the Bois-Colombes plant near Paris as Hispano-Suiza's premier luxury car plant, and while the Spanish operations continued to produce luxury cars, mostly the smaller, less expensive models, production in Spain moved increasingly to the production of buses, trucks, and aircraft engines at several plants located around the country.

Through the 1920s and into the 1930s, Hispano-Suiza built a series of luxury cars with overhead camshaft engines of increasing performance. On the other hand, in the 1930s, Hispano-Suiza's V-12 car engines reverted to pushrod valve actuation to reduce engine noise.

During this time, Hispano-Suiza released the 37.2 Hispano-Suiza car built at the Bois-Colombes works.

The mascot statuette atop the radiator after World War I was the stork, the symbol of the French province of Alsace, taken from the squadron emblem painted on the side of a Hispano-Suiza powered fighter aircraft that had been flown by the World War I French ace Georges Guynemer.

The Hispano-Suiza T49 was also designed and made by the Spanish arm of the company between 1924 and 1944; it was the Spanish production version of the H6B model with a 6-cylinder engine of 8,000 cm3, 160 hp and a maximum speed of 177 km / h.

In 1925, Carlos Ballester obtained permission to represent Hispano-Suiza in Argentina. The agreement consisted of a phase in which the chassis were imported, followed by complete domestic production in Argentina. Thus Hispano Argentina Fábrica de Automóviles (HAFDASA) was born, for the production of Hispano-Suiza motors and automobiles, and also the production of spare parts for other car, truck, and bus manufacturers.

Spanish Civil War and WWII
After the outbreak of the Spanish Civil War in 1936, the regional government of Catalonia, on behalf of the Second Spanish Republic, collectivized control of Hispano-Suiza's Spanish factories and placed the company on a war footing. The company was divided into three sections:
 aircraft engines and cannons
 cars and trucks
 machine tools
Because of the international isolation of the Spanish republic, the Spanish arm of the company suffered from shortages.

In 1937, the French government took control of the French subsidiary of Hispano-Suiza with a 51 per cent share of the capital for the provision of war materiel, renaming the company La Société d’exploitation des matériels Hispano-Suiza. In 1938, the French company ceased automobile production and concentrated on aircraft engine production. At the time, Hispano-Suiza had just introduced a new series of water-cooled V-12 engines and the Hispano-Suiza 12Y was in great demand for practically every type of French aircraft. However, without the Spanish factories, Hispano-Suiza lacked the capacity to deliver enough engines for the rapidly growing French air force, and many new French fighter aircraft remained grounded for the lack of an engine when World War II began.

A development of the era were a series of 20 mm autocannon, first the Hispano-Suiza HS.9, followed by the Hispano-Suiza HS.404. The 404 was licensed for production in Britain and equipped almost all RAF fighter aircraft during the war. Production was also set up in the US, but these versions never matured even though the USAAC and US Navy both wanted to use it in place of their existing .50 BMG weapons. A lesser-known success was the Hispano-Suiza HS.820, a higher performance 20 mm design that was also used in the US as the M139. A variation of the 20 mm guns used on the Lockheed P-38 Lightning aircraft were produced by International Harvester. In 1970 Hispano-Suiza sold their armaments division to Oerlikon, the HS.820 becoming the KAD.

In 1940, Hispano-Suiza, together with the Spanish bank Banco Urquijo and a group of Spanish industrial companies, founded the 'Sociedad Ibérica de Automóviles de Turismo' (S.I.A.T.). This led to Spain's first mass-production car maker, SEAT. After the civil war, Hispano-Suiza in Spain was severely affected by the war devastated economy and the trade embargoes imposed by the allies. In 1946, Hispano-Suiza sold off its Spanish automotive assets to ENASA, a state owned company belonging to the Instituto Nacional de Industria.

1950s–present

After the Second World War, the French arm of Hispano-Suiza continued primarily as an independent aerospace firm. Between 1945 and 1955, it was building the Rolls-Royce Nene under license, designing landing gear in 1950 and Martin-Baker ejection seats in 1955. The company's attention turned increasingly to turbine manufacturing and, in 1968, it was taken over and became a division of SNECMA. In 1999, Hispano-Suiza moved its turbine operations to a new factory in Bezons, outside Paris, using the original factories for power transmissions and accessory systems for jet engines. In 2005, SNECMA merged with SAGEM to form SAFRAN.

The brand saw an attempt at a revival in the automotive sector with the showing of a model at the 2010 Geneva Motor Show by a firm affiliated with Erwin Leo Himmel. However, the planned production never materialised.

Another attempt at a revival of the Hispano-Suiza automotive brand occurred at the 2019 Geneva Motor Show with the debut of the Hispano-Suiza Carmen, an all-electric sports car. This car was presented by the company Hispano Suiza Cars associated with the Peralada Group owned by the Suqué Mateu family, descendants of one of Hispano-Suiza's original founders, . The car's design was influenced by the 1938 Hispano-Suiza H6B Dubonnet Xenia.

Gallery

Cars

The models H6B (1919–29), H6C (1924–29), I6 (1924), Hispano-Suiza Junior or HS26 (1931–32), J12 (1931–38) and K6 (1934–37) were made by the French division, the rest were manufactured in Spain.

Aircraft

 Hispano Barrón, 1919
 Hispano-Suiza E-30, 1930
 Hispano-Suiza E-34, 1935

Aircraft engines

See also
 Hispano Aviación
 Hispano-Argentina
 Ballester–Molina
 Timeline of most powerful production cars
 Marc Birkigt

References

External links

 
 La Hispano Suiza Fábrica de Automóviles, S.A. (a company associated with Peralada Group)
 Company history at RitzSite
 French Hispano-Suiza website (now part of Safran)
Hispano Suiza Automobilmanufaktur AG
 Gallery of Hispano-Suiza cars
 Hispano-Suiza truck & bus history (in Spanish)
 "Hispano-Suiza 12B" a 1949 Flight article

 
Aircraft engine manufacturers of France
Aircraft engine manufacturers of Spain
Bus manufacturers of Spain
Car manufacturers of Spain
Manufacturing companies established in 1904
Vehicle manufacturing companies established in 1904
Defunct motor vehicle manufacturers of Spain
Luxury motor vehicle manufacturers
Truck manufacturers of Spain
Spanish companies established in 1904
Sports car manufacturers
Car brands